Nehalennia is a genus of very small damselflies in the family Coenagrionidae. Most of the species are commonly known as Sprites. One species, N. speciosa occurs in Eurasia; the rest in North and South America.

This genus contains the following six species:
Nehalennia gracilis  – Sphagnum Sprite
Nehalennia integricollis  – Southern Sprite
Nehalennia irene  – Sedge Sprite
Nehalennia minuta  – Tropical Sprite
Nehalennia pallidula  – Everglades Sprite
Nehalennia speciosa  – Pygmy damselfly, Sedgling

References

Coenagrionidae
Zygoptera genera
Taxa named by Edmond de Sélys Longchamps